Donald C. Reinhoudt (born March 5, 1945) is an American former powerlifter and strongman. He won the IPF World Powerlifting Superheavyweight Championship four consecutive times (1973–1976), and won the World's Strongest Man in 1979.

Widely considered to be one of the greatest powerlifters of all time, Reinhoudt set over forty powerlifting records throughout his career and held all four of the powerlifting records in his day.

Athletics
At Fredonia High School, Reinhoudt was an All-League basketball player, an All-Western New York football player and an All-Western shot putter.

Reinhoudt began lifting weights when he was an 18-year-old defensive end at Parsons College, a small college in Iowa. Reinhoudt not only played college football for four years, but was also on the varsity track team.

He competed in six Olympic weightlifting competitions, including the 1967 Junior Nationals.

Powerlifting
After experimenting with weightlifting, Reinhoudt began powerlifting in 1969. For the young Reinhoudt, his powerlifting idols, were Jon Cole, John Kuc and Jim Williams - the all-time great pioneers of the sport.

Reinhoudt took 3rd place in his first International appearance in the Open Division at the inaugural 1972 AAU World Powerlifting Championships with a 2,150 lb total finishing only behind John Kuc and Jim Williams. He went on to finish in 1st place 4 times in a row at the World Powerlifting Championships from 1973 to 1976, also winning the US National titles during the same span. He was the only Super Heavyweight to hold IPF World Records in all three lifts (squat, bench press, deadlift) as well as in the Total simultaneously. He was also the first man to break the 2,400 lb barrier, with a 2,420 lb total (was later downgraded with the actual weight of 2391 pounds or 1084.5 kg), achieved in 1975. This Total of 2391 lb stood until 2013 as the highest powerlifting total ever achieved without supportive equipment (raw), making Reinhoudt effectively one of the strongest men in the history of powerlifting. Reinhoudt had all in all three meets, in which he totaled more than 2350 pounds. Reinhoudt is also one of the few lifters ever to have squatted more than 900 pounds raw (934.5) and bench pressed in excess of 600 pounds raw (607.4). In 1976, he even attempted a 904-pound deadlift three times in official meets (including at the IPF World Championships) and pulled it up past his knees but could not lock it out completely. Had he managed it, he would have been the only lifter in history, whose name is registered in all of the three powerlifting hall of fames for the 900 pound raw squat, 600 pound raw bench press and 900 pound deadlift. Additionally, Reinhoudt often missed other lifts only very closely, which would have been even bigger world records. For example, one year at the AAU Senior Nationals he bench pressed 620 pounds (raw) to full lockout but got two red lights for raising his toe during the lift. One time at national championships, Reinhoudt squatted 950 pounds raw without knee wraps, in only a thin Olympic belt. It didn't count, because it was deemed one inch too high - it would have been the all-time world record until June 2016.

On November 10, 1976, after winning the IPF World Championships, Reinhoudt retired from powerlifting mainly due to the inconvenience his heavy weight caused to his health, such as shortness of breath and lack of flexibility. He quickly dropped his weight from 365 to 239 pounds in the time span of only four months. In preparation for his appearance at the 1978 World's Strongest Man, Reinhoudt competed one last time at the Eastern Open in 1977, in the 275-pound class, where he set four world records: At 264 pounds bodyweight he totalled 2000 lb (725/525/750). He never competed in powerlifting afterwards and put all his energy on lifting for the World's Strongest Man shows.

Meet results
1972 AAU World Championships  Bronze, +242 lb Class  (Harrisburg, Pennsylvania)
Squat: 830 lb, Bench: 590 lb, Deadlift: 730 lb---Total: 2150 lb

1973 IPF Champion +110 kg (+242 lb) Class (Harrisburg, Pennsylvania)
Squat: 407.5 kg (899 lb), Bench: 262.5 kg (579 lb), Deadlift: 362.5 kg (799 lb)---Total 1032.5 kg (2277 lb)

1974 IPF Champion +110 kg (+242 lb) Class (New York City, New York)
Squat: 410 kg (904 lb), Bench: 252.5 kg (557 lb), Deadlift: 375 kg (827 lb)---Total: 1037.5 kg (2288 lb)

1975 IPF Champion +110 kg (+242 lb) Class (Birmingham, England)
Squat: 400 kg (882 lb), Bench: 250 kg (551 lb), Deadlift: 380 kg (838 lb)---Total: 1030 kg (2271 lb)

1976 IPF Champion +110 kg (+242 lb) Class (New York City, New York)
Squat: 390 kg (860 lb), Bench: 252.5 kg (557 lb), Deadlift: 372.5 kg (821 lb)---Total: 1015 kg (2238 lb)

World's Strongest Man
After retiring from powerlifting in 1976, Reinhoudt was invited to the 1977 World's Strongest Man contest. While being on a hardcore diet, he had just lost 125 lbs of body weight from 365 to 239. So he declined but vowed to compete in the following year. He competed in the following three competitions from 1978 to 1980. In 1978 he was leading field over the most part of the competition, but lost the final tug of war by losing balance and finishing 2nd to Bruce Wilhelm. The following year Reinhoudt won the competition in 1979, beating a young Bill Kazmaier. He was forced to withdraw from the 1980 World's Strongest Man competition after tearing his biceps and left hamstring, which proved to be career ending injuries. He retired from competition in August 1980, shortly after this contest.

Personal records

Powerlifting
Powerlifting competition records:

done in official Powerlifting full meets

Squat - 934.5 lb (423.9 kg) raw without knee wraps (935.0 lb @336 lb, which later weighed out at 934.5 lb)
→ former IPF world record in SHW class (+regardless of weight class)
→ former all-time highest raw squat in SHW class (+regardless of weight class) for almost 20 years from April 10, 1976 to July 16, 1995*
→ former all-time highest raw squat without knee wraps in SHW class (+regardless of weight class) for almost 40 years from April 10, 1976 to June 13, 2015 where it was surpassed by Ray Williams 938 lb (425.5 kg).
Bench press - 607.4 lb (275.5 kg)  raw
→ former IPF world record in SHW class (+regardless of weight class); surpassed by Wayne Bouvier's 610 pounds
Deadlift - 885.5 lb (401.6 kg) raw
→ former IPF world record in SHW class (+regardless of weight class); surpassed by Bill Kazmaier's 886 pounds
→ former all-time world record deadlift in SHW class (+regardless of weight class) from May 5, 1975 to November 29, 1981**
Powerlifting Total - 2391.5 lb* (904.5-601.5-885.5) raw with only ace bandages  (1097.7 kg (415.0-276.7-406.0) / 2420 lb (915.0-610.0-895.0) @357 lb, which later weighed out at 2391 lb)
→ former IPF world record in SHW class (+regardless of weight class); surpassed by Bill Kazmaier's 2425 pounds
→ former all-time world record powerlifting total in SHW class (+regardless of weight class) from May 5, 1975 to January 31, 1981***
→ former all-time highest unequipped powerlifting total in SHW class (+regardless of weight class) for over 35 years since 1975; surpassed by Andrey Malanichev's 2425 lbs (1100 kg) on December 7, 2013. 

Career aggregate total (best official lifts) - 2427.4 lb (934.5 + 607.4 + 885.5)

* surpassed by Mark Henry with 948.0 lbs (430.0 kg) with knee wraps on July 16, 1995.

** the former all-time world record in the deadlift was previously held by Jon Cole at 882 pounds; it was surpassed by Bill Kazmaier with 886.26 lb on November 29, 1981.

** the former all-time world record total was previously held by Jon Cole at 2370 lb (weighed out at 2364 lb); it was surpassed by Bill Kazmaier with 2425 lb on January 31, 1981.

Powerlifting gym records (unofficial):

done in training

Squat - 1000 lb raw
Bench Press - 606 lb raw
Deadlift - 950 lb raw

Career aggregate unofficial total (best training lifts) - 2556 lb (1000 + 606 + 950)

Incline bench press - 575 lb (in 1980) raw
Deadlift - 900 lb for 3 reps raw

Weightlifting

Reinhoudt only did Olympic lifting in his younger years when he weighed approximately 240 pounds

Snatch: 260 lb
Clean and Jerk: 370 lb
Olympic Lift Total: 630 lb

combined weightlifting/powerlifting Supertotal: 630 lb + 2391 lb = 3021 lb

5-best-lift total: 260 lb + 370 lb + 934.5 lb + 607 lb + 885.5 lb = 3057 lb

World's Strongest Man records

done in WSM 1979

 Barrel Overhead Press: 300 lbs barrel - winning lift 1979 (lifting barrel of the ground to arm's length)
 Car Lift Deadlift: 2550 lbs car - second best lift 1979 (lifting two tires off the ground)
 Girl Lift (Squat on Smith Machine) - 1000 lbs  (453.5 kg) winning lift 1979

Personal life
Reinhoudt is married to his wife Pam and has two children from his previous marriage - Molly and Ben. He is known to be a Christian. After obtaining a degree in finance, Reinhoudt worked as an accountant in his parents' accounting firm and later was the director of the Chautauqua County Youth Bureau, a position he held until his retirement. In his position as Youth Bureau Director, Don gave various motivational speeches to youth in Western New York, often including minor feats of strength in his presentations, such as picking people up with his teeth, driving nails through boards with his hands, and tearing license plates and phone books.

Measurements

measurements without exercising or "pumping up"

 Height: 6-foot-3-inches to 6-foot-4-inches (190 to 193 cm)
 Weight: up to 380 pounds (172.5 kg)
 Neck size: 22 inches (56 cm)
 Chest: 60 inches (152,5 cm)
 Upper arm: 22 3/4 inches  (58 cm)
 Forearm: 18 1/2 inches (47 cm)
 Thighs: 34 inches (86,5 cm)
 Shoe size: 15 EEE
 According to Terry Todd Don Reinhoudt is one of the biggest world-class lifters in Olympic or powerlifting history.

Recognition
International Powerlifting Federation Hall of Fame - Class of 1980
World Powerlifting Hall of Fame - Class of 1998
Greater Buffalo Sports Hall of Fame - Class of 2005
United States Powerlifting Hall of Fame
Chautauqua County
Chautauqua Sports Hall of Fame

See also
 Jim Williams
 John Kuc
 Jon Cole
 Bill Kazmaier

References 

1945 births
Living people
American powerlifters
American strength athletes
American male weightlifters
Parsons Wildcats football players
People from Brocton, New York
20th-century American people
21st-century American people